Agios Georgios is a village located in the Paphos District of Cyprus.

References

Communities in Paphos District